Stephen J. Lipson (born 16 March 1954) is an English record producer, audio engineer, guitarist and songwriter. As a record producer, he has worked with many artists including Annie Lennox, Propaganda, Act, Frankie Goes to Hollywood, Will Young, Geri Halliwell, Jeff Beck, Billie Eilish and Hans Zimmer. He has also engineered, played guitar on and contributed to much of the programming on many of the records he has produced.

Collaborations 
 Playing in the Flame – Sally Oldfield (1981)
 Slave to the Rhythm – Grace Jones (1985)
 Earthrise – Tandy Morgan (1985)
 Street Fighting Years – Simple Minds (1989)
 Flowers in the Dirt – Paul McCartney (1989)
 Real Life – Simple Minds (1991)
 Diva – Annie Lennox (1992)
 A Spanner in the Works – Rod Stewart (1995)
 Medusa – Annie Lennox (1995)
 Live the Life – Michael W. Smith (1998)
 Ronan – Ronan Keating (2000)
 Scream If You Wanna Go Faster – Geri Halliwell (2001)
 Turn It On – Ronan Keating (2003)
 Bare – Annie Lennox (2003)
 Counting Down the Days – Natalie Imbruglia (2005)
 Keep On – Will Young (2005)
 Future Past – Duncan James (2006)
 Let It Go – Will Young (2008)
 Winter Songs – Ronan Keating (2009)
 Reality Killed the Video Star – Robbie Williams (2009)
 P.A.R.C.E. - Juanes (2010)
 Fires – Ronan Keating (2012)
 Time of My Life – Ronan Keating (2016)
 The Heart is Strange – xPropaganda (2022)

Awards and nominations

External links

Worlds End Management & Music – Stephen Lipson

Living people
English record producers
English songwriters
English audio engineers
English male guitarists
1954 births
Place of birth missing (living people)
The Trevor Horn Band members
British male songwriters